Yohannan V Bar Isa was Patriarch of the Church of the East from 1000 to 1011.

Life
Yohannan was bishop of al-Sin or Shenna when he was consecrated as archbishop of Fars by PatriarchMari (r.987–999). He ordained Elijah, the future archbishop of Nisibis, at the monastery of Mar Shemʿon in his role as bishop of Shenna on 15 September 994.

According to Bar Hebraeus:

After the catholicus Mari had fulfilled his office for fourteen years, he died in the first month of the year 390 of the Arabs, that is to say on the twenty-eighth day of the former kanun [December] in the year 1311 of the Greeks [AD 999].  He was succeeded by Yunanis II, the metropolitan of Fars.  This man, when he heard of the death of Mari, went to Shiraz, to the governor Baha al-Dawla, and won his support.  Baha al-Dawla thereupon ordered that he should become catholicus.  When the nobles of Baghdad heard that he had assumed the leadership uncanonically, by going to the governor's palace without being either elected or acclaimed, they were deeply offended, but were unable to oppose the edict.  And so he was consecrated catholicus against the wishes of his people.

Yohannan consecrated Elijah as bishop of Beth Nuhadra (present-day Dohuk, Iraq) on 15February 1002.

Bar Hebraeus also reported in his Ecclesiastical Chronicle that Abdisho, the Metropolitan of Merv, wrote and informed Catholicos Yohannan between 1007 and 1009 concerning the conversion of 200,000 Keraites to the Church of the East requesting directions concerning the observance of Lent for the Keraites lived almost exclusively on milk and meat and could not give up both. It is reported that Yohannan responded that a fast which we now call Molokan should be permitted to them.

See also
 List of patriarchs of the Church of the East
 Sergius of Samarkand

Notes

References

Citations

Bibliography
 Abbeloos, J. B., and Lamy, T. J., Bar Hebraeus, Chronicon Ecclesiasticum (3 vols, Paris, 1877)
 Assemani, J. A., De Catholicis seu Patriarchis Chaldaeorum et Nestorianorum (Rome, 1775)
 
 Brooks, E. W., Eliae Metropolitae Nisibeni Opus Chronologicum (Rome, 1910)
 Gismondi, H., Maris, Amri, et Salibae: De Patriarchis Nestorianorum Commentaria I: Amri et Salibae Textus (Rome, 1896)
 Gismondi, H., Maris, Amri, et Salibae: De Patriarchis Nestorianorum Commentaria II: Maris textus arabicus et versio Latina (Rome, 1899)

Patriarchs of the Church of the East
11th-century bishops of the Church of the East
Nestorians in the Abbasid Caliphate
1011 deaths